The 1961–62 Hovedserien was the 18th completed season of top division football in Norway.

Overview
It was contested by 16 teams, and Brann won the championship, their first league title.

Teams and locations
''Note: Table lists in alphabetical order.

League table

Results

Notes and references

Norway - List of final tables (RSSSF)

Eliteserien seasons
Norway
1961 in Norwegian football
1962 in Norwegian football